The 2019–20 HockeyAllsvenskan season was the 15th season that the second tier of Swedish ice hockey has operated under that name. The series consisted of 14 teams playing a regular season in which each team played each other team four times, twice at home and twice away. This was followed by a series of promotion and relegation tournaments, with the teams finishing first through eight participating in promotion playoffs, and the teams finishing 13th and 14th forced to requalify to avoid relegation to the Hockeyettan.
However, after the regular season, on 15 March 2020 the Swedish Ice Hockey Association (SIHA) cancelled the post-season due to the COVID-19 pandemic in Sweden. No teams will be promoted nor relegated to or from HockeyAllsvenskan, and the next season of HockeyAllsvenskan will feature the same teams.

Björklöven won the regular season with a record-setting 121 points, beating the previous record of 109 points.

Participating teams

Regular season

Standings

Statistics

Scoring leaders

The following shows the top ten players who led the league in points, at the conclusion of matches played on 6 March 2020. If two or more skaters are tied (i.e. same number of points, goals and played games), all of the tied skaters are shown.

Leading goaltenders
The following shows the top ten goaltenders who led the league in goals against average, provided that they have played at least 40% of their team's minutes, at the conclusion of matches played on 6 March 2020.

Post-season

Finals
The top two teams from the regular season met in a best-of-five tournament, with the winner advancing directly to the SHL qualifiers, and the losing team forced to play an additional playoff.

IF Björklöven vs. Modo Hockey

HockeyAllsvenskan playoffs
Teams 3–8 from the regular season played a single round-robin tournament, with teams 3–5 getting home-ice advantage. The season would then be over for all but the winning team, which would advance to meet the loser of the HockeyAllsvenskan finals in a playoff to the SHL qualifiers.  Teams also started with bonus points based on their position in the regular season standings. Team 3 began with three points, team 4 with two points, and team 5 with one point.

Playoff to the SHL qualifiers
In the playoff to the SHL qualifiers, the losing team from the HockeyAllsvenskan finals would meet the winning team from the HockeyAllsvenskan playoffs in a best-of-three series. The winning team would advance to the SHL qualifiers.

SHL qualifiers
Two teams from the HockeyAllsvenskan and two teams from the SHL would play a best-of-seven series, with the winner qualifying for play in the 2020–21 SHL season. The winner of the HockeyAllsvenskan finals would meet team 14 from the SHL, while the winner of the playoff to the SHL qualifiers would meet team 13 from the SHL.

HockeyAllsvenskan qualifiers
Teams 13 and 14 from the regular season would defend their spots in HockeyAllsvenskan in the HockeyAllsvenskan qualifiers against the four best teams from Hockeyettan.

References

Allsvenskan
Sweden
HockeyAllsvenskan
HockeyAllsvenskan seasons